Warheart is Terry Goodkind's eighteenth novel. This is the 15th in The Sword of Truth series and the fourth novel in Goodkind's new Richard and Kahlan series, which takes off right after the end of the original Sword of Truth series.

Warheart marks the end of Richard and Kahlan's journey and is the final battle in a war three-millennia old. With Hannis Arc and Emperor Sulachan marching towards the heart of D'Hara, Kahlan faces her greatest challenge and must fight for the world of life and for Richard's very existence.

Plot 
All is lost. Evil will soon consume the D'Haran Empire. Richard Rahl lies on his funeral pier. It is the end of everything.

Except what isn't lost is Kahlan Amnell. Following an inner prompting beyond all reason, the last Confessor will wager everything on a final desperate gambit, and in so doing, she will change the world forever.

Terry Goodkind's Warheart is the direct sequel to, and the conclusion of, the story begun in The Omen Machine, The Third Kingdom, and Severed Souls.

References

External links

 Official Terry Goodkind website

The Sword of Truth books
2015 American novels
2015 fantasy novels
American fantasy novels
Tor Books books